Up in Hell is the third studio album from American heavy metal band Incite.  It was released on September 2, 2014 via Minus Head Records.

Track listing

References 

Incite albums
Albums produced by Logan Mader
2014 albums